Heinrich Wilhelm Brüssow (born 21 July 1986) is a South African former professional rugby union player. His usual position was as open-side flanker and his most recent club was Northampton Saints in the English Premiership.

Early career

Born 21 July 1986 in Bloemfontein, South Africa, Heinrich Brüssow attended Grey College in Bloemfontein where he played in the First XV and was later selected for the Under-18 Free State Craven Week side. Brüssow was part of the Free State Cheetahs squad who shared the Currie Cup glory in 2006 with the Blue Bulls, before playing in the 2007 Currie Cup final against the Golden Lions, scoring a crucial try and helping the team to a 20–18 win. In 2008 he was voted best open-side flanker in the Super 14 and Currie Cup. This earned him a call-up to the Springboks squad for the November 2008 tour to the British Isles. He only played the final 4 minutes in the end-of-tour test against England.

Professional career
In 2009, Brüssow was again a flanker in the Super 14 competition. However, selectors excluded him from the Springboks squad. Soon afterwards he played for the Free State Cheetahs against the British and Irish Lions team; Brüssow was finally called up for Schalk Burger, who failed to recover from an injury for the first test against the Lions. He received the Man-of-the-Match award in the Springboks' win against the All Blacks on 25 July 2009. Brüssow once again featured in a Currie Cup final in 2009, but the Free State Cheetahs lost to a hungry Blue Bulls team.

Early March 2010 Brüssow's career took a blow when he injured his cruciate knee-ligament in a Super 14 game against the Hurricanes, which kept him from international rugby till August 2011. For the Cheetahs in the 2011 super rugby season Brussow was part of the Cheetahs team that finished 11th in the table. The cheetahs won five and lost eleven games that season which showed that they were not at their best. However they produced some wonderful wins against the Waratahs and the Brumbies. In the 2011 tri-nations Brüssow only came in at the third game against eventual champions Australia. South Africa lost the match 14–9. South Africa had nothing much to play for in final test against New Zealand but they could certainly spoil the party for the All Blacks. Brüssow put up a Man-of-the-Match winning performance and South Africa beat the All Blacks by 18–5.

He returned to international competition on 13 August 2011 against Australia: He played for a short stint from the bench where he showed he still had the full ability which made him so popular in 2009.  On 20 August Heinrich Brüssow gave a Man-of-the-Match display of his skills as the Springboks managed to defeat their arch-enemies, the All Blacks in Port Elizabeth.

Brüssow played the first game against Wales which South Africa won 17–16 and against Fiji which the boks also won 49–3. However against Namibia, Alberts was favoured to Brüssow in the starting line up which meant Brüssow had to drop to the bench. South Africa won the game and Brüssow restored his place in the starting line up against Samoa which South Africa won to reach the quarter-finals of the World Cup. In the quarter-finals Brussow started against Australia. South Africa lost the game 11–9 and were knocked out of the competition. In the summer internationals, Brüssow was shockingly dropped from the team with new South Africa coach Heyneke Meyer preferring Marcell Coetzee. Even without Brüssow's commitment, South Africa won the series against England with a win in the first test 22–17, second test 36–27 but were held to a draw in the third test 14–14.

In January 2018, he joined English Premiership side Northampton Saints.

He announced his retirement from all forms of professional rugby on Wednesday 23 October 2019.

Squads
2013
 Cheetahs (Vodacom Super Rugby)
2012
 Toyota Free State Cheetahs (ABSA Currie Cup Premier Division)
 Cheetahs (Vodacom Super Rugby)
2011
 Springboks squad (2011 Rugby World Cup)
 Springboks squad (Tri Nations (rugby union))
 Toyota Free State Cheetahs (ABSA Currie Cup Premier Division)
 Cheetahs (Vodacom Super 14) – Re-injured March 2011
2010
 Cheetahs (Vodacom Super 14) – Injured March 2010
2009
 Springboks spring tour squad (France, Italy & Ireland)
 Springboks squad (British and Irish Lions Tour)
 Springboks squad (Tri Nations (rugby union))
 Vodacom Free State Cheetahs (British and Irish Lions Tour)
 Cheetahs (Vodacom Super 14)
2008
 Springboks spring tour squad (British Isles)
 Vodacom Free State Cheetahs (ABSA Currie Cup Premier Division)
 Cheetahs (Vodacom Super 14)
2007
 Vodacom Free State Cheetahs (Vodacom Cup)
 Vodacom Free State Cheetahs (ABSA Currie Cup Premier Division)
 Cheetahs (Vodacom Super 14)
2006
 Vodacom Free State Cheetahs (ABSA Currie Cup Premier Division)
 Vodacom Free State Cheetahs (Vodacom Cup)
2005
 Free State (SA Under 19)
2004
 Free State (U18 Coca-Cola Craven Week)

Influential Games

2009 
 20 June 2009 : South Africa vs British and Irish Lions I: Heinrich Brüssow replaces injured Schalk Burger in the starting line-up. His ball-stealing and recovering skills proved too much for the Lions. When he was replaced in the second half, the Lions managed to fight back, but not enough to win the game. Scored a try from the back of a maul and was outstanding as they went on to secure a 2–1 series victory.
 27 June 2009 : South Africa vs Lions II: Brüssow came on in the 62nd minute and effected a few crucial turn-overs helping seal the 28–25 victory for the South Africans.
 25 July 2009 : South Africa vs All Blacks I: Although being targeted, Brüssow battled competently against Richie McCaw, who is widely considered the best open-side flanker in the world. He made a number of crucial turn-overs and tackles. He was named Man-of-the-Match in the 28–19 victory.
1 August 2009 : South Africa vs All Blacks II: Continuing to build on his reputation, Brüssow again managed to compete with the All Black captain Richie McCaw at the breakdown. He once again made a number of crucial turnovers, tackles and powerful runs as the Boks won 31–19.
8 August 2009 : South Africa vs Wallabies I: Brüssow was once again in outstanding form for the Springboks as his ruck work, brutal hits and ball-carrying led South Africa to victory over Australia. His opposite number George Smith, also considered one of the best in world rugby, could not cut it with Brüssow, and his frustration led to a yellow card.
13 November 2009 : South Africa vs France: It was a grey evening for the men in green, as they were out-muscled by France 20–13. Brüssow, though, stood up and kept the Springboks in the match with several vital turnovers and tackles. Even though it was a defeat, the match in Toulouse was considered Brüssow's best in a test jersey up to that stage, and was named SA Rugby young player of the year.

2011 
20 August 2011: After a lengthy injury lay-off, Brüssow returned to the international stage in the Springboks' final two Tri Nations matches of the 2011 season. After a short stint against Australia (13 August 2011), he played a full game against New Zealand All Blacks. With a first-off whitewash on the cards, Brüssow's fetching skills would be vital, in order for the Boks to gain some momentum before the (RWC World Cup 2011). Brüssow delivered a Man-of-the-Match winning performance. One that saw him make some fantastic and crucial turnovers, immense tackles and ball carries while going through an enormous amount of donkey work and taking a boot to the face for his efforts. Brüssow ended the game with a bloodied, pockmarked face and bandage, but most probably assured his place in Peter de Villiers' plans for rugby's greatest stage in New Zealand, the 2011 Rugby World Cup.
9 October 2011: After South Africa progress to the quarter finals of the Rugby World Cup they lose 11–9 in Wellington to be knocked out of the competition.

Tournament Winner Medals

Awards
2011
South Africa medal for reaching quarter final
2009
 SA Rugby Young Player of the Year
 Provincial Player of the Castle SA 2009 Lions Series
{nominee} SA Player of the Year
2008
{nominee} Sasol Young Player of the Year
{nominee} ABSA Currie Cup Premier Division Player of the Year

Playing Style

Heinrich Brüssow is well known in South Africa because of his immense and unstoppable work at the breakdowns and in the scrums. He was selected for the South African team due to his excellent work performances. He was also admired by many when he outfought New Zealand captain Richie McCaw in two of their duels, one which South Africa won 18–5.

References

External links
 Who's Who SA: Heinrich Brussow
 
 Genslin.us: Springbok Hall of Fame
 ESPN Scrum.com Profile
 SARugby.com Profile
 Sky Sport Profile
 Planet Rugby Profile
 Daylife.com News, photos and quotes
 Zimbio news,information and photos
 Sporting Heroes profile
 OFM: Speler Profiel

1986 births
Living people
Afrikaner people
Alumni of Grey College, Bloemfontein
Cheetahs (rugby union) players
Expatriate rugby union players in Japan
Free State Cheetahs players
NTT DoCoMo Red Hurricanes Osaka players
Rugby union flankers
Rugby union players from Bloemfontein
South Africa international rugby sevens players
South Africa international rugby union players
South African expatriates in Japan
South African rugby union players
University of the Free State alumni